Lion lights are flashing lights set up around a perimeter facing outwards; which are used to scare away lions.

The lion lights were devised by Maasai Richard Turere to prevent night attacks by lions on his family's cattle herd, which was in Kitengela on the unfenced south side of Nairobi National Park, in Kenya. These types of attacks often lead to the hunting and killing of the lions, which are endangered.

When Richard Turere was 9 he tried kerosene lamps and scarecrows but these proved not to work, but he noticed that the lions did not attack when people were present, and he theorised that they were deterred by moving torchlight. Therefore, Turere  placed LED lights around the perimeter of his family's cow shed, connected them to vehicle indicator flashers, and powered the system from car batteries charged by a solar panel.

The lion attacks ceased and soon neighbours were asking for him to set up similar systems around their farms. The cattle were also calmer because the lights meant that they could see the land around was safe.

Based on this invention, Turere won a scholarship to Brookhouse School.

Although originally intended for lions, lion lights may also work for other predators such as leopards and cheetahs.

References

Mammal pest control
Inventions
Society of Kenya